Daytona Motorsport Ltd is a motorsports company that owns and runs karting circuits in Milton Keynes, Manchester, Sandown Park and Tamworth. (with a location previously in Lydd). It caters for drivers aged 6–80 years old and holds monthly "Inkart" championships. Graduates from the individual circuits include Formula First champion Alex Kapadia, Ginetta Junior driver William Tregurtha, Formula Renault race winner Ivan Taranov, as well as Robert Huff and Howard Fuller. British GT driver Jordan Albert also originated from this track, as well as several established Super One drivers (mostly in the Cadet classes).

It holds other events, including Daytona's exclusive DMAX national championships and the Open Endurance Karting Championship, as well as corporate karting events. Famous drivers to complete Daytona's race school include current Formula E racer, Sam Bird.

Daytona Motorsport was founded in 1990 by Charles Graham, the CEO of the Daytona Group. The Daytona Group began with indoor karting circuits across London in the 1990s, with limited staff.

The organisation was purchased by Brands Hatch Leisure Group in 1998, which was in turn purchased by Octagon in 1999. In June 2003 the founders of Daytona bought back the organisation. 

Notable people that have utilised the Daytona circuits include Sam Bird, Viktor Jensen and Duncan Tappy, as well as Formula 1 racers Lewis Hamilton, Martin Brundle, David Coulthard and Damon Hill.

Venues 
Daytona's first venue was an indoor circuit at Wood Lane, London, which opened in 1990. It was followed by a second indoor circuit in London in 1992. The two circuits were joined together to form a "GP Circuit" in 1994, which was visited by Tom Cruise, Brad Pitt and Sandra Bullock.

As of 2018, Daytona operates three venues in Milton Keynes, Surrey and Tamworth.

Daytona's Manchester venue is located near to Old Trafford. The indoor course is located in a purpose-built, heated  venue that opened in October 2000. This venue is no longer owned by Daytona.

The Milton Keynes venue opened in 1996 as "Daytona International".

The venue at Sandown Park, Surrey, has two outdoor circuits. The venue has both single and twin-engine karts.

The Priory Park track in Tamworth was previously owned by Tamworth Karting, but closed in January 2014 due to a dispute between the company and the owner of the property. It was purchased by Daytona, and was subsequently extended, with opposition by local residents. Daytona also wanted to increase the number of karts on the track from 12 to 30.

At the Milton Keynes and Sandown Park venues, Daytona have a large fleet of Cadet (Honda Single 160cc), Junior (Honda Single 200cc), Senior (Sodi Single 390cc), and DMAX (Birel 2-stroke 125cc) karts to cater for any driver. At the indoor Manchester venue, Daytona run similar karts but with slightly less power due to the nature of the circuit.

In October 2018, Daytona sold Daytona Manchester, their only indoor facility, to rivals TeamSport Go Karting, to focus on providing racing at their three outdoor tracks. For 2019, Daytona also decided to drop the travelling DMAX Championship to focus on providing racing at their own venues as opposed to travelling to other circuits, much akin to the Club100 brand.

References 

Kart racing
Sports organizations established in 1990
Motorsport in England